Spring Glen is an unincorporated community in Schuylkill County, Pennsylvania, United States. Spring Glen has a post office with ZIP code 17978, which opened on February 24, 1880.

References

Unincorporated communities in Schuylkill County, Pennsylvania
Unincorporated communities in Pennsylvania